Tilataei is the name of a Thracian tribe that was located in Serdica. They are mentioned by Thucydides.

References

See also
List of Thracian tribes

Ancient tribes in Thrace
Thracian tribes